Unleashed is the seventh studio album by American country music artist Toby Keith. It was released on August 6, 2002 by DreamWorks Records. The album produced four hit singles on the US Billboard Hot Country Songs charts with "Courtesy of the Red, White and Blue (The Angry American)", "Who's Your Daddy", "Rock You Baby", and "Beer for My Horses" (a duet with Willie Nelson). "Courtesy of the Red, White and Blue (The Angry American)", "Who's Your Daddy", and "Beer for My Horses" all reached number one while "Rock You Baby" peaked at number 13.  The album was Keith's first to reach number one on the U.S. Billboard 200 and was 4× Platinum by the RIAA for sales of four million copies in the United States.

Upon reaching number one, "Beer for My Horses" was Keith's long-lasting number one single, having spent six weeks at the top of the charts. The song also made Nelson the oldest male country singer to reach the top of the country charts at the time.

Track listing
All songs written by Toby Keith and Scotty Emerick unless noted otherwise.
 "Courtesy of the Red, White and Blue (The Angry American)" (Toby Keith) - 3:15
 "Who's Your Daddy?" (Keith) - 3:57
 "Good to Go to Mexico" (Keith, Chuck Cannon) - 2:59
 "It's All Good" - 3:17
 "Beer for My Horses" (featuring Willie Nelson) - 3:30
 "Losing My Touch" - 3:14
 "Huckleberry" (Keith, Cannon) - 3:28
 "It Works for Me" - 3:03
 "Ain't It Just Like You" - 3:59
 "Rock You Baby" - 4:01
 "Rodeo Moon" (Keith, Chris LeDoux) - 3:53
 "That's Not How It Is" - 3:41
 "Live Introduction By Toby Keith of 'Courtesy of the Red, White and Blue (The Angry American)'" - 1:29

Some editions of the CD do not include Track 13

Personnel
Chris Collins - acoustic guitar, mandolin
Scotty Emerick - acoustic guitar, background vocals
Kim Fleming - background vocals
Shannon Forrest - drums
Paul Franklin - steel guitar
Vicki Hampton - background vocals
Mike Haynes - trumpet
Wes Hightower - background vocals
Clayton Ivey - keyboards, piano
Toby Keith - lead vocals
Jerry McPherson - electric guitar
Liana Manis - background vocals
Brent Mason - electric guitar
Steve Nathan - keyboards, piano
Willie Nelson - duet vocals on "Beer for My Horses"
Michael Rhodes - bass guitar
John "JR" Robinson - drums
John Wesley Ryles - background vocals
Michael Thompson - electric guitar
Biff Watson - acoustic guitar
Lari White - background vocals
Curtis Young - background vocals

Charts

Weekly charts

Year-end charts

References

External links
 

2002 albums
Toby Keith albums
DreamWorks Records albums
Albums produced by James Stroud
Albums produced by Toby Keith